The Light heavyweight class in the boxing competition was the second-highest weight class. Light heavyweights were limited to those boxers weighing a maximum of 81 kilograms (178.6 lbs). 18 boxers qualified for this category. Like all Olympic boxing events, the competition was a straight single-elimination tournament. Both semifinal losers were awarded bronze medals, so no boxers competed again after their first loss. Bouts consisted of six rounds each. Five judges scored each bout.

Medalists

Schedule

Draw

References

Boxing at the 1968 Summer Olympics